Friedrich Tiedemann FRS HFRSE (23 August 178122 January 1861) was a German anatomist and physiologist. He was an expert on the anatomy of the brain.

Tiedemann spent most of his life as professor of anatomy and physiology at Heidelberg, a position to which he was appointed in 1816, after having filled the chair of anatomy and zoology for ten years at Landshut, and died at Munich. He was elected member of the Royal Swedish Academy of Sciences in 1827. In 1836, he was elected Honorary Fellow of the Royal College of Surgeons in Ireland.

Life
Tiedemann was born at Cassel in Prussia (now central Germany), the eldest son of Dietrich Tiedemann (1748–1803), a philosopher and psychologist of considerable repute.

Friedrich studied medicine at Marburg, Bamberg and Würzburg Universities from 1798 and graduated in 1802. Undertaking practical experience he gained his doctorate (MD) from Marburg in 1804, but soon abandoned practice.

From 1804 he became a Docent, lecturing in Physiology and Comparative Osteology at Marburg University. In only one year (1805) he was raised to Professor aged only 24. This was as Professor of Zoology, Human Anatomy and Comparative Anatomy at Landshut University. In 1816 he moved to Heidelberg University as Professor of Physiology and Anatomy and remained there until retiring in 1849.

He was elected a Foreign Fellow of the Royal Society of London in 1832 and an Honorary Fellow of the Royal Society of Edinburgh in 1838.

He died in Munich on 22 January 1861. He is buried in the Alter Südfriedhof in Munich (Old South Cemetery).

Viewpoints

Tiedemann devoted himself to the study of natural science, and, upon moving to Paris, France, became an ardent follower of Georges Cuvier. On his return to Germany he maintained the claims of patient and sober anatomical research against the prevalent speculations of the school of Lorenz Oken, whose foremost antagonist he was long reckoned. His remarkable studies of the development of the human brain, as correlated with his father's studies on the development of intelligence, deserve mention.

Tiedemann was one of the first persons to scientifically contest racism. In his article entitled "On the Brain of the Negro, compared with that of the European and the Orang-outang" (1836), he argued based on craniometric and brain measures taken by him from Europeans and black men from different parts of the world that the then-common European belief that Negroes have smaller brains and are thus intellectually inferior is scientifically unfounded and based merely on the prejudice of travellers and explorers.

In 1827 he became correspondent of the Royal Institute of the Netherlands, when that became the Royal Netherlands Academy of Arts and Sciences in 1851 he joined as foreign member. He was elected a Foreign Honorary Member of the American Academy of Arts and Sciences in 1849.

Tiedemann was influenced by Jean-Baptiste Lamarck and accepted the transmutation of species. Science historian Robert J. Richards has written that Tiedemann "joined the basic notion of species evolution, of a Lamarckian flavor, with the proposition that higher animals in their embryological development recapitulated the morphological stages of those lower in the scale." Writing in 1913, Hans Gadow noted that Tiedemann in 1814 had identified a basic function of sexual selection in preventing less fit males from propagating, and fossils as showing gradual metamorphosis of species over geological time.

By the 1860s, the tobacco historian Friedrich Tiedemann had reported several cancers of the tongue brought on by smoking.

Family

In 1807 he married Frauline von Holzing. He was later married to Charlotte Hecker.

He had a daughter Elise.

One of Tiedemann's sons, Gustav, was a casualty of the 1848 uprisings.

His son Heinrich immigrated to Philadelphia and became a physician in Philadelphia's Germantown Hospital. Perhaps influenced by his father's work, he objected to the Darwinian contention of a continuity between humans and apes.

Legacy
In 2007, Brazilian geneticist Sergio Pena called Tiedemann an "anti-racist ahead of his time".

Works (translated)

References

Attribution:

External links
Neurotree: Friedrich Tiedemann Details
The Great Physiologist of Heidelberg – Friedrich Tiedemann by Stephen Jay Gould

1781 births
1861 deaths
Fellows of the American Academy of Arts and Sciences
Foreign Members of the Royal Society
German physiologists
19th-century German zoologists
Lamarckism
Members of the Royal Netherlands Academy of Arts and Sciences
Members of the Royal Swedish Academy of Sciences
Recipients of the Pour le Mérite (civil class)
Proto-evolutionary biologists